Lewis Cook may refer to:

 Lewis Cook (footballer, born 1997), English footballer (Bournemouth AFC)
 Lewis Cook (footballer, born 1983), English footballer (Wycombe Wanderers, AFC Wimbledon)
 Lewis Cook (Canadian football), a former Canadian football player
 Lewis H. Cook, American farmer and politician